The Bishop of Exeter is the ordinary of the Church of England Diocese of Exeter in the Province of Canterbury. Since 30 April 2014 the ordinary has been Robert Atwell. 

From the first bishop until the sixteenth century the Bishops of Exeter were in full communion with the Roman Catholic Church. However, during the Reformation the Church of England broke away from the authority of the Pope and the Roman Catholic Church, at first temporarily and later more permanently. Since the Reformation, the Bishop and Diocese of Exeter has been part of the reformed and catholic Church of England. The bishop's residence is The Palace, Exeter.

History

Roman episcopal organization survived the fall of the Roman Empire in south-western Britain, which became the British kingdom of Dumnonia. In about 700, Aldhelm, abbot of Malmesbury wrote a letter to King Geraint of Dumnonia and his bishops. However, by this time eastern Devon had been conquered by the Anglo-Saxons and was part of the diocese of Bishop of Winchester, covering the whole of Wessex. In around 705 The diocese was divided in two and Aldhelm was appointed the first Bishop of Sherborne, covering eastern Devon. Over the next two centuries western Devon was conquered.

Crediton
In about 909 the diocese of Sherborne was divided and the Diocese of Crediton was created to cover  Devon and Cornwall. Crediton was chosen as the site for its cathedral possibly due it having been the birthplace of Saint Boniface and the existence of a monastery there.

In 1046, Leofric became the Bishop of Crediton. Following his appointment he decided that the see should be moved to the larger and more culturally significant and defensible walled town of Exeter. In 1050, King Edward the Confessor authorised that Exeter was to be the seat of the bishop for Devon and Cornwall and that a cathedral was to be built there for the bishop's throne. Thus, Leofric became the last diocesan Bishop of Crediton and the first Bishop of Exeter.

Exeter
The two dioceses of Crediton and Cornwall, covering Devon and Cornwall, were permanently united under Edward the Confessor by Lyfing's successor Leofric, hitherto Bishop of Crediton, who became first Bishop of Exeter under Edward the Confessor, which was established as his cathedral city in 1050. At first the Abbey Church of St Mary and St Peter, founded by Athelstan in 932, rebuilt in 1019, etc., finally demolished 1971, served as the cathedral.

The bishop of Exeter signs his name as his Christian name or forename followed by Exon., abbreviated from the Latin Episcopus Exoniensis ("Bishop of Exeter").

Cathedral

The present cathedral was begun by William de Warelhurst in 1112, the transept towers he built being the only surviving part of the Norman building, which was completed by Marshall at the close of the twelfth century. The cathedral is dedicated to St Peter.

As it now stands, the cathedral is in the decorated style. It was begun by Peter Quinel (1280–1291), continued by Bytton and Stapeldon, and completed, much as it has since remained, by John Grandisson during his long tenure of 42 years.

In many respects Exeter cathedral resembles those of France rather than others found in England. Its special features are the transept towers and the choir, containing much early stained glass. There is also an episcopal throne, separated from the nave by a choir screen (1324) and a stately West front. In a comparison with certain other English cathedrals, it is perhaps disadvantaged by the absence of a central tower and a general lack of elevation, but it is undoubtedly very fine.

Organisation
The bishops of Exeter, like the general population of the diocese, always enjoyed considerable independence, and the see was one of the largest and richest in England. The remoteness of the see from London prevented it from being bestowed on statesmen or courtiers, so that over the centuries the roll of bishops possessed more capable scholars and administrators than in many other sees. The result was a long and stable line of bishops, leading to active Christian observance in the area.

The diocese contained 604 parishes grouped in four archdeaconries: Cornwall, Barnstaple, Exeter, and Totnes. There were Benedictine, Augustinian, Premonstratensian, Franciscan and Dominican religious houses, and four Cistercian abbeys.

Modern history
This wealthy diocese was forced to cede land during the reign of Henry VIII, when Vesey was obliged to surrender fourteen of twenty-two manors, and the value of the see was reduced to a third of what it had been. Vesey, despite his Catholic sympathies, held the see until 1551, when he finally had to resign, and was replaced by the Bible translator Miles Coverdale. Following the accession of Mary, in 1553, Vesey was restored, but died soon after in 1554. He was succeeded by James Turberville, the last Catholic Bishop of Exeter. Turberville was removed from the see by the Reformist Elizabeth I in 1559, and died in prison, probably in or about 1570.

Henry Phillpotts served as Bishop of Exeter from 1830 to his death in office in 1869. He was England's longest serving bishop since the 14th century. The diocese was divided in 1876 along the border of Devon and Cornwall, creating the Diocese of Truro (but five parishes which were at the time in Devon were included in this diocese as they had always been within the Archdeaconry of Cornwall). The diocese covers the County of Devon. The see is in the City of Exeter where the seat is located at the Cathedral Church of Saint Peter which was founded as an abbey possibly before 690. The current incumbent is Robert Atwell.

List of bishops

Pre-Conquest

Pre-Reformation

During the Reformation

Post-Reformation

Assistant bishops
Among those who have served as assistant bishops of the diocese have been:
mid-1860s: James Chapman, Rector of Wootton Courtenay and former Bishop of Colombo
19001918 (d.): Alfred Earle, Dean of Exeter, remained Bishop of Marlborough despite resigning its duties as suffragan for West London
While he was Rector of Down St Mary (1897–1903), Kestell Kestell-Cornish, retired Bishop of Madagascar, sometimes assisted the bishop
19471952 (ret.): Rocksborough Smith, Rector of Lapford and former Bishop of Algoma

See also
Bishop of Cornwall

References

Sources
 Some text adapted from Catholic Encyclopaedia, 1908.

Diocese of Exeter
Exeter
Bishops of Exeter
Christianity in Devon
Christianity in Cornwall